The 2016–17 Emporia State Lady Hornets basketball team represented Emporia State University in the 2016–17 NCAA Division II women's basketball season, which was the 43rd Lady Hornets basketball season. The Lady Hornets were led by 7th-year head coach, Jory Collins. The team played their home games on Slaymaker Court at William L. White Auditorium in Emporia, Kansas, the home court since 1974. Emporia State was a member of the Mid-America Intercollegiate Athletics Association.

Preseason outlook
The Lady Hornets entered the 2016–17 season after finishing with a 28–5 overall, 17–5 in conference play last season under Collins. In the previous season, the Lady Hornets finished third in regular conference play, won the MIAA Basketball Tournament for the fourth consecutive year, and advanced to their fifth straight NCAA Sweet 16, which they lost to in-state rival, Pittsburg State.

The Lady Hornets were chosen as the favorite to win in the MIAA Preseason Coaches Poll. On November 1, 2016, the Women's Basketball Coaches Association released their preseason poll with Emporia State as the fourth ranked team.

2016–17 Roster

Media
The Lady Hornets basketball games are broadcast on KFFX-FM, Mix 104.9.

Schedule
Source: 

|-
! colspan="12" style=""|Exhibition

|-
! colspan="12" style=""|Non-conference regular season

|-
! colspan="12" style=""|MIAA regular season

|-
! colspan="6" style=""|2017 MIAA Tournament

|-
! colspan="6" style=""|2017 NCAA Tournament

Rankings

References

Emporia State Lady Hornets basketball seasons
2016 in sports in Kansas
2017 in sports in Kansas